Batman: Hush is a 2019 American animated superhero film featuring the DC Comics superhero Batman and loosely based on the 2002 comic book story arc of the same name. It is the thirteenth installment of the DC Animated Movie Universe and the 35th overall film of the DC Universe Animated Original Movies. In the film, Batman forms an alliance with Catwoman to defeat a new villain named Hush, who knows all of Batman's secrets and targets the key figures in his life.

Plot 
After Batman rescues an abducted child from Bane for a ransom, Lady Shiva approaches Batman to inform him of an unknown Lazarus Pit intruder and requests his help in identifying the intruder. Batman agrees to do so as Catwoman steals the ransom. While pursuing her, a masked vigilante shoots through Batman's grapple line, causing him to fall onto the sidewalk and crack his skull. Catwoman rescues him from a gang of criminals who tried to unmask him, but Batgirl chases her away. Batgirl takes Batman back to the Batcave where Alfred and Dick Grayson create an alibi for how Bruce Wayne suffered the injury. Alfred contacts Bruce's childhood friend Thomas Elliot, a renowned brain surgeon, to aid his skull. When Bruce declares himself ready to be Batman again two weeks earlier than Thomas advised him to be up and around, Alfred gives him a new bulletproof batsuit with a padded cowl for better skull protection. Meanwhile, Catwoman delivers the ransom to Poison Ivy, who has been controlling her with a hypnotic kiss. The masked vigilante who shot Batman then arrives to confront Ivy about the ransom and gives her Kryptonite.

Batman helps Amanda Waller retrieve Bane from police custody in return for information. Waller uses the special tranquilizers supplied by him to stop Bane from escaping police custody and capture him herself. Batman later reluctantly works with Catwoman to find Ivy, following a lead given by her to Metropolis. There, Batman confronts Lex Luthor, now a probationary member of the Justice League after helping them defeat Cyborg Superman, about delivery list of an ethylene compound utilized by Ivy. Ivy uses Kryptonite lipstick to take control of Superman and orders him to kill Catwoman and Batman. Catwoman pushes Lois Lane off a building to free Superman from the mind control. After Ivy is defeated, she reveals she was acting on the orders of a vigilante known only as "Hush".

Hush later kidnaps the Joker to persuade Harley Quinn into attacking an opera Bruce, Selina, and Thomas are attending. During the commotion, Hush lures Thomas outside and kills him, framing the Joker for the murder, much to Batman's anger. The Joker attempts to claim his innocence before Batman brutally beats him and nearly kills him. Following the Joker's arrest and Thomas' funeral, Bruce deduces that Hush knows he is Batman. While on patrol, Hush catches Batman's attention and confronts him, although Hush tricks him by using mirrors. He then threatens to hurt everyone close to him, prompting Batman to reveal his identity to Catwoman. Bruce takes Selina to the Batcave, where she meets Dick and Alfred and learns of Bruce's son Damian. The two become a crime-fighting couple, but Hush later lures Dick and Selina to Thomas’ grave, where they are attacked by Scarecrow. Dick is incapacitated by Scarecrow's fear toxin while Hush kidnaps Selina.

Shortly after, Commissioner James Gordon informs Bruce of a break-in at Thomas’ office. While investigating, Batman learns that one of Thomas' patients was someone using the alias of crossword puzzle inventor Arthur Wynne, leading him to suspect the Riddler was behind the break-in. At Arkham Asylum, Batman interrogates Riddler, who reveals that he had deduced his secret identity while using the Lazarus Pit to cure his untreatable brain tumor, and took on the identity of Hush due to his lack of respect among other villains. However, Batman deduces that this "Riddler" is actually Clayface in disguise and, after defeating him, learns where the real Riddler has taken Selina: a factory whose name is an anagram of Arthur Wynne.

At the factory, Batman rescues Selina and defeats Riddler, who is growing weaker as the healing effects of the Lazarus Pit are wearing off. With the building about to explode, Batman risks his own life to try and save Riddler from falling into a vat of molten metal. Realizing this, Selina cuts the grapple line holding Riddler and lets him fall to his death to give Batman enough time to escape. Once they reach safety, Batman and Selina argue over the latter's actions and decide to call off their relationship due to Selina being unable to cope with Bruce's moral code.

Voice cast

Penguin, Two-Face, and Mr. Freeze appear in unvoiced cameos in a montage scene of Batman and Catwoman fighting crime together.

Production
Batman: The Animated Series alumni Kevin Conroy (Batman) and Mark Hamill (the Joker) teased producing an animated adaptation of Hush during a panel at Canada's Fan Expo in 2016. In July 2018, an animated adaptation of Batman: Hush was announced.

Jason O'Mara, Jerry O'Connell, Rebecca Romijn, Rainn Wilson, Sean Maher, Bruce Thomas, Vanessa Williams, and Stuart Allan reprise their roles from previous DCAMU films, while the new additions include Jennifer Morrison, Peyton R. List, Maury Sterling, Geoffrey Arend, Jason Spisak, Adam Gifford, Peyton List, and Dachie Alessio. Peyton List reprises her role as Poison Ivy, after previously appearing in the role in a live action form in Gotham. Notably, this is a rare instance in which the two actresses named Peyton List appear in the same production.

Release
The film had its world premiere at the San Diego Comic-Con on July 19, 2019. The film was made available through digital streaming outlets one day later. It was released on 4K UHD Blu-ray, Blu-ray, and DVD on August 6.

Reception

The film earned $3,581,562 from domestic Blu-ray sales.

Notes

References

External links

DC page
 
 Batman: Hush at The World's Finest

2010s English-language films
2010s American animated films
2010s direct-to-video animated superhero films
2010s animated superhero films
2019 animated films
2019 films
2019 direct-to-video films
Animated action films
Animated Batman films
DC Animated Movie Universe
American science fiction action films
Animated science fiction films
2019 science fiction action films
Films set in 2019
Animated films about revenge